A tetrapod is a four-limbed animal of the superclass Tetrapoda.

Tetrapod may also refer to:

 Tetrapod (structure), a type of structure used to prevent erosion in coastal engineering
 Tetrapod (table) or analogion, a lectern or slanted stand used to display the Gospel Book in churches

See also
 Tetrapodomorpha, a clade of vertebrates consisting of tetrapods and their closest relatives
 
 Tripod (disambiguation)